"Missing Me" is a song written and performed by Australian singer Angie McMahon. The song was released in February 2018 as the second single from McMahon's debut studio album Salt (2019). The song was certified gold in Australia in 2019.

Upon released, McMahon told Richard Kingsmill on Triple J "It felt like a lot of things, it's sad but it also makes me feel powerful when I sing it. That's what songwriting is for me, it's therapy; it's a way to get over the thing. I had all the feelings bubbling under the surface and that was the unleashing, the tipping point, the sassy empowerment song."

The song polled at number 49 on the Triple J Hottest 100, 2018.

Reception
Al Newstead from Triple J described the song as "a punchy, angsty rumbler" saying "The stark, stabbing opening chords and Angie's vocals plumb the depths of anger, confusion, and rejection but wipes the sadness away with a powerful performance that laps like waves between wounded sorrow and sass; it's bruised and bluesy but also an emboldening biteback."

Track listing
Digital download
"Missing Me" – 3:19

Certifications

Release history

References 

2018 songs
2018 singles